al-Rumi (also transcribed as ar-Rumi), or its Persian variant of simply Rumi, is a nisba denoting a person from or related to the historical region(s) specified by the name Rûm. It may refer to:

 Jalāl ad-Dīn Muhammad Rūmī, Persian poet, Islamic jurist, theologian, and mystic commonly referred to by the moniker Rumi
 Suhayb ar-Rumi, a companion of Muhammad
 Qāḍī Zāda al-Rūmī, 14th-century mathematician
 Ibn al-Rumi, 9th-century Arabic poet
 Dhuka al-Rumi, 10th-century Abbasid governor of Egypt
 Al-Adli ar-Rumi, 9th-century Arab chess player and theoretician
Mustafa Rumi, 16th-century Ottoman general 
 Sarjun ibn Mansur al-Rumi, Umayyad official
 Yāqūt Shihāb al-Dīn ibn-'Abdullāh al-Rūmī al-Hamawī, 13th-century scholar 
 Ahmet Câmî-i Rûmî, 16th-century Ottoman official
 Shah Sultan Rumi, 11th-century Sufi saint of Bengal

Rumi
Toponymic surnames